Itzhak Perlman (born August 31, 1945) is an Israeli-American violinist widely considered one of the greatest violinists in the world. Perlman has performed worldwide and throughout the United States, in venues that have included a State Dinner at the White House honoring Queen Elizabeth II, and at President Barack Obama's inauguration. He has conducted the Detroit Symphony Orchestra, the Philadelphia Orchestra, and the Westchester Philharmonic. In 2015, he was awarded the Presidential Medal of Freedom. Perlman has won 16 Grammy Awards, including a Grammy Lifetime Achievement Award, and four Emmy Awards.

Early life
Perlman was born in 1945 in Tel Aviv. His parents, Chaim and Shoshana Perlman, were Jewish natives of Poland and had independently emigrated to the British Mandate of Palestine (now Israel) in the mid-1930s before they met and later married. Perlman contracted polio at age four and has walked using leg braces and crutches since then and plays the violin while seated. , he uses crutches or an electric Amigo scooter for mobility.

Perlman first became interested in the violin after hearing a classical music performance on the radio. At the age of three, he was denied admission to the Shulamit Conservatory for being too small to hold a violin. He instead taught himself how to play the instrument using a toy fiddle until he was old enough to study with Rivka Goldgart at the Shulamit Conservatory and at the Academy of Music in Tel Aviv (now the Buchmann-Mehta School of Music), where he gave his first recital at age 10. He moved to the U.S. at age 13 to study at the Juilliard School with the violin teacher Ivan Galamian and his assistant Dorothy DeLay.

Career

Performing

 
Perlman gained national attention when he appeared on The Ed Sullivan Show twice in 1958, and again in 1964, on the same show with the Rolling Stones. His performances on the show included pieces such as Rimsky-Korsakov's "Flight of the Bumblebee", Wieniawski's "Polonaise Brillante", and Mendelssohn's first violin concerto. 

Soon after, Perlman began touring cities in the U.S. and Canada as a soloist, with sponsorship from the Zionist Organization of America, and quickly established himself as a leading virtuoso. He made his Carnegie Hall debut performing Wieniawski's Violin Concerto No. 1 in 1963 and won the Leventritt Competition in 1964. As a soloist, Perlman debuted with the London Symphony Orchestra in 1968, and at the Salzburg Festival with the Vienna Philharmonic in 1972. In the following years, he toured as a soloist worldwide. 

In addition to an extensive recording and performance career, Perlman has continued to make appearances on television shows such as The Tonight Show and Sesame Street as well as playing at a number of White House functions.

Although Perlman has never been billed or marketed as a singer, he sang the role of "Un carceriere" ("a jailer") on a 1981 EMI recording of Puccini's "Tosca" that featured Renata Scotto, Plácido Domingo, and Renato Bruson, with James Levine conducting. He had earlier sung the role in an excerpt from the opera on a 1980 Pension Fund Benefit Concert telecast as part of the Live from Lincoln Center series with Luciano Pavarotti as Cavaradossi and Zubin Mehta conducting the New York Philharmonic.

On July 5, 1986, Perlman performed at the New York Philharmonic's tribute to the 100th anniversary of the Statue of Liberty, which was televised live on ABC. The orchestra, conducted by Mehta, performed in Central Park.

In 1987, Perlman joined the Israel Philharmonic Orchestra (IPO) for its concerts in Warsaw and Budapest as well as other cities in Eastern bloc countries. He toured with the IPO in the spring of 1990 for its first-ever performance in the Soviet Union, with concerts in Moscow and Leningrad, and again in 1994, performing in China and India.

In 2015, on a classical music program titled The Chamber Music Society of Lincoln Center produced by WQXR in New York City, it was revealed that Perlman performed the uncredited violin solo on the 1989 Billy Joel song "The Downeaster Alexa".

While primarily a solo artist, Perlman has performed with a number of other musicians, including Yo-Yo Ma, Pinchas Zukerman, Jessye Norman, Vladimir Ashkenazy, Isaac Stern, and Yuri Temirkanov at the 150th anniversary celebration of Tchaikovsky in Leningrad in December 1990.

As well as playing and recording the classical music for which he is best known, Perlman has also played jazz, including an album made with jazz pianist Oscar Peterson, and klezmer. He has been a soloist in a number of film scores, such as the theme of the 1993 film Schindler's List by John Williams, which won an Academy Award for Best Original Score. More recently, he was the violin soloist in the 2005 film Memoirs of a Geisha along with cellist Yo-Yo Ma. Perlman played selections from the musical scores of the movies nominated for "Best Original Score" at the 73rd Academy Awards with Ma and at the 78th Academy Awards.

Selected performances

Perlman played at the state dinner attended by Queen Elizabeth II on May 7, 2007, in the East Room at the White House.

He performed John Williams's "Air and Simple Gifts" at the 2009 inauguration ceremony for Barack Obama along with Ma (cello), Gabriela Montero (piano), and Anthony McGill (clarinet). The quartet played live, but the music played simultaneously over speakers and on television was a recording made two days earlier due to concerns that the cold weather could damage the instruments. Perlman was quoted as saying: "It would have been a disaster if we had done it any other way."

He made an appearance in Disney's Fantasia 2000 to introduce the segment Pines of Rome, along with Steve Martin.

On November 2, 2018, Perlman reprised the 60th anniversary of his first appearance on The Ed Sullivan Show as a guest on The Late Show with Stephen Colbert.

Teaching
In 1975, Perlman accepted a faculty post at the Conservatory of Music at Brooklyn College. In 2003, he was named the Dorothy Richard Starling Foundation Chair in Violin Studies at the Juilliard School, succeeding his teacher, Dorothy DeLay. He also teaches students one-on-one at the Perlman Music Program on Long Island, NY, rarely holding master classes.

The Perlman Music Program
The Perlman Music Program, founded in 1994 by Perlman's wife, Toby Perlman, and Suki Sandler, started as a summer camp for exceptional string musicians between the ages of 12 and 18. Over time, it expanded to a yearlong program. Students have the chance to have Perlman coach them before they play at venues such as the Sutton Place Synagogue and public schools. By introducing students to each other and requiring them to practice together, the program strives to have musicians who would otherwise practice alone develop a network of friends and colleagues. Rather than remain isolated, participants in the program find an area where they belong.

Conducting
At the beginning of the new millennium, Perlman began to conduct. He took the post of principal guest conductor at the Detroit Symphony Orchestra. He served as music advisor to the Saint Louis Symphony Orchestra from 2002 to 2004. In November 2007, the Westchester Philharmonic announced his appointment as artistic director and principal conductor. His first concert in these roles was on October 11, 2008, in an all-Beethoven program featuring pianist Leon Fleisher performing the Emperor Concerto.

Instruments

Perlman plays the Soil Stradivarius violin of 1714, formerly owned by Yehudi Menuhin and considered one of the finest violins made during Stradivari's "golden period." Perlman also plays the Guarneri del Gesù 1743 'Sauret' and the Carlo Bergonzi 1740 'ex-Kreisler'.

Personal life
Perlman lives in New York City with his wife, Toby, also a classically trained violinist. They have five children, including Navah Perlman, a concert pianist and chamber musician. Perlman is a distant cousin of the Canadian comic and television personality Howie Mandel. He has synesthesia and was interviewed for Tasting the Universe by Maureen Seaberg, which is about the condition.

Discography 
 Tradition (1987)
 Duos (1987)
 Vivaldi: The Four Seasons/3 Violin Concertos (1992)
 Dvořák in Prague: A Celebration (Sony Classical, 1994, and Kultur Video, 2007)
 The American Album (1995)
 In the Fiddler's House (1995)
 Holiday Tradition (1998)
 Concertos from My Childhood (EMI, 1999)
 The Essential Itzhak Perlman (Sony Classical, 2009)
 Eternal Echoes: Songs and Dances for the Soul  (Sony Classical, 2012) with Yitzchak Meir Helfgot
 Violin Sonatas (Universal Music Classics/Deutsche Grammophon, 2015)
 The Perlman Sound (Warner Classics, 2015)

With Andre Previn
 The Easy Winners (Angel Records, 1975)
 A Different Kind of Blues (EMI/Angel, 1980)
 It's a Breeze (EMI/Angel, 1981)

With Oscar Peterson
 Side by Side (TELARC CD-83341 1994)

Honors and awards
1964: Leventritt Competition – Winner
1977: Grammy Award for Best Instrumental Soloist(s) Performance (with orchestra): Antonio Vivaldi: The Four Seasons
1978: Grammy Award for Best Chamber Music Performance:Beethoven: Sonatas for Violin and Piano (w/ Vladimir Ashkenazy)
1978: Grammy Award for Best Classical Album: Brahms: Concerto for Violin in D 
1980: Grammy Award: Best Instrumental Soloist Performance (without orchestra): The Spanish Album
1980: Grammy Award: Best Chamber Music Performance: Music for Two Violins (w/ Pinchas Zukerman)
1980: Grammy Award for Best Instrumental Soloist(s) Performance (with orchestra): Brahms Violin and Cello Concerto in A Minor (w/ Mstislav Rostropovich) (TIE)
1980: Grammy Award for Best Instrumental Soloist(s) Performance (with orchestra): Berg: Violin Concerto/Stravinsky: Violin Concerto in D (TIE)
1981: Grammy Award for Best Instrumental Soloist(s) Performance (with orchestra): Isaac Stern 60th Anniversary Celebration (w/ Isaac Stern & Pinchas Zukerman)
1981: Grammy Award for Best Chamber Music Performance: Tchaikovsky: Piano Trio in A Minor (w/ Lynn Harrell & Vladimir Ashkenazy)
1982: Grammy Award for Best Instrumental Soloist(s) Performance (with orchestra): Elgar: Violin Concerto in B Minor
1987: Grammy Award for Best Chamber Music Performance: Beethoven: The Complete Piano Trios (w/ Lynn Harrell & Vladimir Ashkenazy)
1987: Grammy Award for Best Instrumental Soloist(s) Performance (with orchestra): Mozart: Violin Concertos Nos. 2 and 4 
1990: Grammy Award for Best Chamber Music Performance: Brahms: The Three Violin Sonatas (w/ Daniel Barenboim)
1990: Grammy Award for Best Instrumental Soloist(s) Performance (with orchestra): Shostakovich Violin Concerto No.1 in A Minor/GlazunovL Violin Concerto in A Minor
1995: Grammy Award for Best Instrumental Soloist(s) Performance (with orchestra): The American Album—Works of Bernstein, Barber, Foss
1997: Elected member of the American Philosophical Society
2003: Kennedy Center Honors
April 1980: Newsweek magazine featured Mr. Perlman with a cover story.
1986: Honored with the Medal of Liberty by President Reagan.
1992: Emmy Award: Outstanding Classical Program in the Performing Arts: Perlman in Russia
1994: Emmy Award: Outstanding Individual Achievement: Cultural Programming
1996: Emmy Award: Outstanding Cultural Music-Dance Program: Itzhak Perlman: In the Fiddler's House
1999: Emmy Award: Outstanding Classical Music-Dance Program: Itzhak Perlman: Fiddling for the Future
2000: Awarded the National Medal of Arts by President Clinton
2002: Elected member of the American Academy of Arts and Sciences
2005: Golden Plate Award of the American Academy of Achievement presented by Awards Council member Elie Wiesel.
2008: Grammy Lifetime Achievement Award
2015: Awarded the Presidential Medal of Freedom by President Obama
2016: Awarded the Genesis Prize by the Prime Minister of Israel.
2017: Subject of the documentary Itzhak directed by Alison Chernick.

References

External links

Itzhak Perlman Primo Artists 

Itzhak Perlman biography in the World Concert Artist Directory

PBS American Masters: Itzhak
Itzhak Perlman interview on The Charlie Rose Show (video), August 9, 2010
Itzhak Perlman question and answer session, March 19, 2011
Itzhak Perlman & John Williams interview on The Charlie Rose Show (video), August 8, 1997
The Perlman Music Program

1945 births
Living people
20th-century American Jews
20th-century American male musicians
20th-century classical violinists
20th-century Israeli male musicians
21st-century American Jews
21st-century American male musicians
21st-century classical violinists
21st-century Israeli male musicians
American classical violinists
American male conductors (music)
American male violinists
American people of Polish-Jewish descent
Angel Records artists
Brooklyn College faculty
Deutsche Grammophon artists
Edison Classical Music Awards Oeuvreprijs winners
EMI Classics and Virgin Classics artists
Emmy Award winners
Grammy Award winners
Grammy Lifetime Achievement Award winners
Honorary Members of the Royal Academy of Music
Israeli classical violinists
Israeli conductors (music)
Israeli emigrants to the United States
Jewish Israeli musicians
Israeli people of Polish-Jewish descent
Jewish American classical musicians
Jewish classical violinists
Juilliard School alumni
Juilliard School faculty
Kennedy Center honorees
Leventritt Award winners
Male classical violinists
Musicians from Tel Aviv
People with polio
Presidential Medal of Freedom recipients
United States National Medal of Arts recipients
Wheelchair users
20th-century American violinists
21st-century American violinists